Senator Tallman may refer to:

Clay Tallman (1874–1949), Nevada State Senate
Peleg Tallman (1764–1840), Maine State Senate